Max Modell is a fictional character appearing in American comic books published by Marvel Comics.

Publication history
Max Modell first appeared in The Amazing Spider-Man #648 and was created by Dan Slott and Humberto Ramos.

Fictional character biography
Max Modell is the CEO of Horizon Labs. Marla Madison-Jameson was the one who hooked up Peter Parker with Modell who got Peter a job at Horizon Labs after proving himself by shutting down Sanjani Jaffrey's out-of-control machine. When the Hobgoblin attacks Horizon Labs, Spider-Man saves Max from the Hobgoblin. After the Hobgoblin was repelled, Max comes to find Peter in underwear listening to some music with headphones. Peter stated not hearing the attack and Max walks away. Max later give orders to have the reverbium destroyed much to the chagrin of Jaffrey.

At Andru Air Force Base, Modell has been confirmed to monitor the launch of the rocket that John Jameson will be piloting. Max and John tell J. Jonah Jameson and Marla that Parker will be in attendance. When it comes to the day of the launch, Max Modell was present when Alistair Smythe unleashes the Spider-Slayers on the launch site. During Spider-Man's fight with the Scorpion, Max makes contact with John who tells him that the shuttle is out of control. Max later talks to Peter about a connection to Spider-Man where he thinks that Peter is the one who makes Spider-Man's technology. Spider-Man goes along with that claim. As Peter finishes the device that would negate the Spider-Slayers' sixth sense, Max tells Peter that Spider-Man would lose the enhanced senses if being within the device's blast radius when it explodes.

During the threat of Massacre, Modell meets with police captain Yuri Watanabe where they talk about the criminal-detecting app S.I.S. which would help them find Massacre. They also discover Massacre's true identity and learn being one of Dr. Ashley Kafka's patients.

Modell later tells Peter about the complaints that Grady Scraps and Sanjani gave him about Peter's project heavily borrowing from the two's projects. Peter tells Max of sharing in the credit of that project.

During the "Spider-Island" storyline, Max speaks to Mister Fantastic about broadcasting the correct frequency that could fix Spider-Man's spider senses while keeping the Jackal's Homo Arachus in Manhattan. When Mary Jane Watson asks Modell, Bella Fishbach, and Grady on why being only in stage two of the spider virus, they claim that it was from all those years around Peter. Following the Spider Queen's death, Modell thanks his staff for helping to combat the infestation that plagued Manhattan. It was revealed that Max had secret help developing the cure for the spider infestation from Michael Morbius, an old college friend of Max. Spider-Man later discovered and fought Morbius with Uatu Jackson's help until Max broke up the fight.

Peter and Max later coordinate John's mission on the Apogee 1 Station while opening a channel to J.J.J. This lasts until Juergen Muntz tells them that the Apogee 1 Station is experiencing a full system error caused by the Octobots that were sent there by Doctor Octopus and Mysterio. J.J.J. will hold Max accountable if anything happens to John. Max and J.J.J. watch the fight between Spider-Man, Human Torch, and John against the Octobot-controlled crew of the Apogee 1 Station on the screen. When J.J.J. states that the Apogee 1 station is falling out of orbit, Max states that there are other ways off the Apogee 1 station. As the Apogee 1 station starts to fall to Earth, Max tells J.J.J. to have faith in Spider-Man.

During the "Ends of the Earth" storyline, it is revealed that Max is openly gay and has a partner named Hector Baez who works as Horizon Labs' lawyer. When J.J.J. makes various accusations towards Horizon Labs and plans to shut it down, Hector had to defend Max and Horizon Labs from the accusations.<ref>The Amazing Spider-Man #682. Marvel Comics.</ref> Max was present when the Mayor had all energies at Horizon Labs shut down in an effort to have Horizon Labs shut down. Max and the rest of Horizon Labs make use of a floating laboratory where they work on Spider-Man's project called "Pink Hippo".

Following Spider-Man stopping Doctor Octopus' plot, Modell and the Horizon Labs team are congratulated for their help in stopping the Sinister Six. When Peter is told by Modell that the former should be given credit, Peter told him that he and the other workers did the heavy lifting. Hector tells Max that J.J.J. has restored energy to Horizon Labs as an apology gesture. While working with Max, Morbius was attacked by Spider-Man for robbing Billy Connors' grave, working on Billy's body to find a permanent cure for the Lizard. Max and Morbius even design special harpoons that would pierce the Lizard's skin as Peter states that Lizard considers Curt Connors' human side to be "dead". While also agreeing that Morbius' graverobbing activity was wrong, Max states that he won't have Morbius in Horizon Labs again. When Spider-Man, Morbius, Max, and some Horizon Labs personnel enter the sewers to look for the Lizard, they managed to stab the Lizard with the harpoons and use the cure, regressing him back to Connors. Upon Connors being brought to Horizon Labs, Max runs a diagnostic on Curt where it doesn't find any trace of reptilian DNA where Max is unaware that Connors still has Lizard's vengeance for Spider-Man. When Curt uses the Lizard Formula again to regain the lost right arm, Max gets injected with the formula, turning him into a Lizard. While working on the Lizard Formula, Connors cuts off the right arm to feed to Max's lizard form. Spider-Man was able to restore Max and the other Horizon Labs staff back to their human forms. When Tiberius Stone is missing and some items have gone missing from the office, Max tells Hector to conduct a private investigation. With Morbius incarcerated, Max speaks to Stone and offers a position in his think tank. He is also reviewing a group of candidates for the position. After Andy Maguire is hit by some Parker Particles, Peter, Max, and Hector tell his parents what happened as Max calls in Mister Fantastic, Hank Pym, Iron Man, and Beast to study. After the studying, Mister Fantastic persuades Max to have Andy be Alpha and make the spokesperson for Horizon Labs.

As part of the "All-New, All-Different Marvel", Max Modell and Hector Baez were brought in by Peter Parker to run Parker Industries' West Coast operations where they will be specifically running Horizon University. In addition, Max is also the boss of former Horizon Labs workers Grady and Bella Fishbach. When Max and Hector go to Lab 6, they find Peter in underwear and Kaine Parker in the Spider-Man suit.

During the "Dead No More: The Clone Conspiracy" storyline, Kaine tells Max, Hector, and the rest of Horizon University's employees about the Carrion Virus. Their research is disrupted by the Rhino and the female Electro. Following the Carrion Virus being stopped, Max arrives with S.H.I.E.L.D. and Horizon University personnel to bring the exposed victims back for treatment.

At the conclusion of the "Go Down Swinging" arc, Modell accepts a job application at Horizon University by Superior Octopus under the alias of Dr. Elliot Tolliver.

During the "Spider-Geddon" storyline, Max came in to Dr. Tolliver's lab when he investigated a sound. Elliot miscalibrating the prosthetic's power settings and is near a breakthrough.

Max calls Tolliver to his office where Tolliver admits being the Proto-Clone created by New U Technologies and is hosting Otto Octavius' mind. Modell stated that he already knew of Octavius being the Proto-Clone and Superior Spider-Man as well as stating that he believes in second chances. Upon analyzing the security footage of the leak, Superior Spider-Man finds small spiders and figures out that Spiders-Man of Earth-11580 was responsible. Spiders-Man of Earth-11580 attacks them as Superior Spider-Man uses a Wave Disruption Field to trap the main spider. Getting a confession from him, Superior Spider-Man reveals to Modell about the Spider-Man (Norman Osborn) of Earth-44145. Spiders-Man of Earth-11580 states that Spider-Man of Earth-44145 is safe on his world and that they will never reach him. In Horizon University's sub-basement two, Superior Spider-Man states that they won't be able to power the dimensional transporter without something that can replicate the energies of the Cosmic Cube. Anna Maria Marconi and Living Brain revealed that they harnessed the cosmic energies from the fight with Terrax in the Cosmic Harness invention. When Living Brain enters the cosmic energies into the system, he starts to overload and it causes an explosion. Rescue crews work to save those caught in the explosion. As Modell and Emma Hernandez are loaded onto the ambulances, Anna Maria tells Superior Spider-Man that she will go to the hospital to keep an eye on them. After Doctor Octopus in his restored body defeated Spider-Man of Earth-44145 and sacrificed a mindless clone of Elliot Tolliver during the mission, Max Modell was among those who attended the funeral of Elliot Tolliver.

Other versions
Age of Ultron
In the Age of Ultron reality, Max Modell perished protecting Horizon Labs from the Ultron Sentinels. His skeletal remains are still in Horizon Labs' ruins.

In other media
 Max Modell appears in Marvel's Spider-Man, voiced by Fred Tatasciore. This version is Horizon High's headmaster and teacher to Peter Parker / Spider-Man, Anya Corazon / Spider-Girl, Miles Morales / Ultimate Spider-Man, Gwen Stacy / Ghost-Spider, Harry Osborn / Hobgoblin, and Grady Scraps. Throughout the series, Modell and his school come under attack by numerous supervillains, such as Norman Osborn, Doctor Octopus, the Vulture, Spencer Smythe, Raymond Warren and Curt Connors / Lizard. In the third season Maximum Venom, Modell reveals his knowledge of Parker's secret identity and loses his job after being framed for running "corrupt operations". Despite this, Modell is able to help Spider-Man create the Anti-Venom symbiote to combat the first Klyntar invasion and eventually get his job back after the board of education discovers he was framed by the Dark Goblin. Amidst the second Klyntar invasion, Modell is temporarily possessed by the Venom symbiote until Parker frees him, allowing him to use the symbiote to destroy its seed, permanently ending the invasion. Modell later indirectly inspires Parker to establish the Worldwide Engineering Brigade (W.E.B.).
 Max Modell appears in the Guardians of the Galaxy'' episode "Drive My Carnage", voiced again by Fred Tatasciore.

References

External links
 Max Modell at Marvel Wiki
 Max Modell at Comic Vine

Spider-Man characters
LGBT characters in comics
Fictional businesspeople
Fictional gay males
Characters created by Dan Slott
Marvel Comics scientists